César Prieto (born May 10, 1999) is a Cuban baseball player in the Baltimore Orioles organization.

Career
Prieto was a member of the Cuba national baseball team.  He also joined the Elefantes de Cienfuegos in 2017.  His performance as an infielder and batter was considered one of the best in Cuba. Prieto defected to the United States in 2021 while in Florida for the qualifying tournament for the 2020 Summer Olympics.

On January 16, 2022, Prieto signed with the Baltimore Orioles as an international free agent for a bonus of $650,000.

References

External links

1999 births
Living people
Defecting Cuban baseball players
Defectors to the United States
Elefantes de Cienfuegos players
Naranjas de Villa Clara players
Aberdeen IronBirds players
Baseball infielders
Bowie Baysox players
People from Abreus, Cuba